Monica "Mona" Annie Leydon-Smith (22 January 1915 – 2 April 2002) was a New Zealand swimming representative. She represented New Zealand at the 1938 British Empire Games where she won the bronze medal in the women's 440 yards freestyle.

External links 
 

New Zealand female swimmers
Commonwealth Games bronze medallists for New Zealand
Swimmers at the 1938 British Empire Games
1915 births
2002 deaths
Commonwealth Games medallists in swimming
20th-century New Zealand women
21st-century New Zealand women
Medallists at the 1938 British Empire Games